Keys to the Heart is a 2018 South Korean comedy-drama film directed by Choi Sung-hyun. The film stars Lee Byung-hun, Youn Yuh-jung and Park Jeong-min.

Plot
The story of a down-and-out boxer reconnecting with his estranged, younger brother who is a gifted pianist with savant syndrome.

Cast
 Lee Byung-hun as Jo-ha 
 Park Sang-hoon as young Jo-ha
 Youn Yuh-jung as In-sook
 Park Jeong-min as Jin-tae
 Han Ji-min as Han Ga Yool
 Choi Ri as Soo-jeong
 Hwang Seok-jeong as Department Head Kang 
 Jo Kwan-woo as Moon Seong-gi 
 Oh Hye-won as Bok-ja's entourage	
 Baek Hyun-jin as Dong-soo  
 Moon Sook as Bok-Ja (Special Appearance) 
 Kim Sung-ryung as Madam Hong (Special Appearance)

Production 
Principal photography began on June 6, 2017, and ended on August 27, 2017.

Reception

Critical reception
Yoon Min-sik of The Korea Herald called the characters and plot "generic and predictable", but praise the acting performance of the film.

Shim Sun-ah of Yonhap News Agency praised Choi Seong-hyeon for handling family relationships with the utmost sensitivity, and drawing good performances out of his actors.

Box office
According to figures provided by the Korean Film Council, just 3 weeks after its release, the film had surpassed 3 million viewers.

Awards and nominations

Music Pieces 
The following music pieces appeared in the film:

 Mozart Piano Sonata No.11 in A major 'Rondo Alla Turca' K.331
 Beethoven Piano sonata No.14 in C sharp minor 'Moonlight' Op.27-2 3rd Movement
 Chopin Piano Concerto No.1 in E minor Op.11 3rd Movement
 Brahms Hungarian Dance No.5 in G minor
 Tchaikovsky : Piano Concerto No. 1 in B flat minor, Op. 23

References

External links

2018 films
2018 comedy-drama films
South Korean comedy-drama films
Films about autism
Films about pianos and pianists
CJ Entertainment films
2010s South Korean films